"Demente" is a song by South Korean singer Chungha and Puerto Rican rapper Guaynaa from her first Korean studio album Querencia. It was released on February 15, 2021, through MNH and 88rising. The song is the thirteenth track on the album, and was written by Lao Ra, Guaynaa, Tinashé Fazakerley and Vincenzo and produced by him and Fuxxy. "Demente" solidifies the singer's "versatility as she flawlessly sings in Spanish and Korean" over a reggaeton beat. The song marks the first collaboration between a Korean female soloist and a Latin singer. Lyrically, the song tell a story of a confused love that causes great sadness due to the lack of interest from a lover. 

On February 18, 2021, an animated lyric video of the song was released on YouTube. A Spanish version of the song was released with its music video on 17 March, 2021, as the sixth and last single from Querencia.

Background
"Demente" is under the "Unknown" chapter in Querencia, since the song fits in with the big unknown of her speaking Spanish.  Chungha took up Spanish lessons and relied on a fluent friend to coach her throughout the recording.  The early version of "Play" made the singer interested in Latin.  After she linked up with 88rising, where Miyashiro suggested she progressed into Latin music further, and helped bring "Demente" to life. 88rising and Chungha worked with a lot of different Latin producers on it and stated "that this is not even reggaetón, rather like a different genre of older, classical pop music. Chungha did not want to just infuse a song with some sounds, she really wanted to do it."

On March 15, 2021, Chungha announced through social media that the Spanish version of "Demente", would be released on March 17, 2021. Its cover art was also posted that day. On March 16, the singer dropped a teaser for the music video.

Composition
"Demente" is a Latin-pop and pop song with reggaeton rhythms, aided by Puerto Rican rapper Guaynaa. It was written by Lao Ra, Guaynaa, Tinashé Fazakerley, Laura Carvajalino Avilaand, Vincenzo and produced by him and Fuxxy. The song runs for two minutes and forty-three seconds. In terms of musical notation, the song is composed in the key of G major with a tempo of 100 beats per minute. The song marks the first Latin and K-pop collaboration for a female Korean soloist and "highlights Chungha's refusal to be pinned down or limited by boundaries – either geographical or genre – meshing Korean, Spanish and the dancehall-derived beats into an infectious, vibrant cut". Lyrically, the song tell a story of a confused love that causes great sadness due to the lack of interest of the other person.

Music video
On March 15, the singer confirmed the music video and announced that it was scheduled for release on March 17, 2021. On the March 16, Chungha released a music video teaser for the Spanish version of "Demente". It was directed by VISHOP (Vikings League). The song’s accompanying music video captures Chungha performing the song in a luxurious hotel lobby in various glamorous outfits. Meanwhile, featured artist Guaynaa appears remotely from halfway across the world.

Credits and personnel 
Credits adapted from Tidal.
 Chungha - vocals
 Guaynaa - writer, vocals
 Tinashé Fazakerley - writer, bass, drums, piano, synths
 Vicenzo - writer, producer, vocal director
 Fuxxy - producer, vocal director
 Lao Ra - writer
 Earcandy - mix engineer
 Yoon Won Kwon - mix engineer
 Park Jeong Eon - mastering engineer
 Jung Eun Kyung - record engineer
 Kim Su Jeong - record engineer

Charts

Release history

References

 

 

 
2021 songs
Korean-language songs
Chungha songs
2021 singles
MNH Entertainment singles
Spanish-language songs